Men's gymnastics events were held at the 1955 Pan American Games in Mexico City, Mexico.


Medal table

Medalists

Artistic gymnastics

Men's events

Club swinging

Rope climbing

Trampoline and tumbling

See also
Pan American Gymnastics Championships
South American Gymnastics Championships
Gymnastics at the 1956 Summer Olympics

References 

1955
Events at the 1955 Pan American Games
Pan American Games
1955 Pan American Games